HMS Tilbury was a 58-gun fourth rate ship of the line of the Royal Navy, ordered from Portsmouth Dockyard on 17 December 1742 and built by Peirson Lock to the dimensions laid down in the 1741 proposals of the 1719 Establishment. She was launched on 20 July 1745.

In 1757 Tilbury was under the command of Captain Henry Barnsley, and formed part of Vice Admiral Francis Holburne's expedition to capture Louisbourg. The squadron was dispersed by a storm on 24 September, and Tilbury was driven onto the rocks. Captain Barnsley and 120 of his crew were drowned, and the survivors became French prisoners, though they were treated well by their captors.

Notes

References

Lavery, Brian (2003) The Ship of the Line - Volume 1: The development of the battlefleet 1650-1850. Conway Maritime Press. .
Michael Phillips. Tilbury (58) (1745). Michael Phillips' Ships of the Old Navy. Retrieved 9 August 2008.

Ships of the line of the Royal Navy
1745 ships
Maritime incidents in 1757